The mayor of Kandy is the mayor and head of the Kandy Municipal Council. The post was created in 1866 when the Kandy Municipal Council established by the Municipalities Ordinance of 1865. The offices of the mayor are at the Kandy Town Hall. The mayor's legal title is His worship the Mayor of Kandy.

List of mayors
Parties

References

External links
kandycity.org

 
Kandy